I'm Just Kidding is an Iranian comedy series directed by Mehran Modiri. 67 Iranian actors and actresses played in the series.

The first season contains 24 episodes and released in March 2014.

See also
 Mehran Modiri

References

External links
 

Iranian comedy television series
2010s Iranian television series
2014 Iranian television series debuts
2014 Iranian television series endings